Carl Wu is a Chinese-American scientist, and a Bloomberg Distinguished Professor of biology, molecular biology and genetics at Johns Hopkins University. He is active in the fields of chromatin and gene expression.

Early life and education 
Carl Wu was born in Hong Kong. Wu attended St. Joseph's High School in Hong Kong and won a scholarship to attend Saint Mary's College of California. He began his research in chromatin biology while pursuing his doctorate at Harvard University, under Sarah Elgin. Subsequently, Wu completed his post-doc as a Junior fellow of the Harvard Society of Fellows under Nobel laureate Walter Gilbert, where he provided the first evidence for DNase hypersensitive sites at cellular gene promoters.

Career

National Cancer Institute and HHMI 
In 1982, Wu joined the National Cancer Institute within the National Institutes of Health. Here he began investigating the biochemical mechanism of chromatin remodeling. In 1994, his group discovered that enzymatic activity was necessary for creating accessible DNA sites on chromatin. The following year his lab purified and characterized the responsible chromatin remodeling enzyme called NURF. This work was recognized by Nature as a breakthrough discovery in the field of gene expression. Wu went on to become the chief of the Laboratory for Molecular Cell Biology at the cancer institute; then chief of the Laboratory of Biochemistry and Molecular Biology.

In 2012, Wu joined Janelia Research Campus of the Howard Hughes Medical Institute as a Senior Fellow of the Transcription Imaging Consortium.

Johns Hopkins University 
In 2016, Wu joined the Johns Hopkins University as the 23rd Bloomberg Distinguished Professor. His appointment bridges the Department of Biology in JHU's Zanvyl Krieger School of Arts and Sciences and the Department of Molecular Biology and Genetics in the School of Medicine. Through this interdisciplinary appointment, Wu combined his research efforts in biochemistry and live cell imaging into a single unified effort.

Awards 

Wu was elected as a member of the National Academy of Sciences in 2006 and the National Academy of Medicine in 2010. He is also a Member of Academia Sinica and the European Molecular Biology Organization, and a fellow of the American Academy of Arts and Sciences.

Publications 
Wu has more than 27,000 citations in Google Scholar and an h-index of 80.

 Pubmed ctiations
 Google Scholar citations

Selected articles 

 1995, Heat shock transcription factors: structure and regulation, in: Annual Review of Cell and Developmental Biology. Vol. 11, nº 1; 441–469.
 2004 with G Mizuguchi, X Shen, J Landry, S Sen, ATP-driven exchange of histone H2AZ variant catalyzed by SWR1 chromatin remodeling complex, in: Science. Vol. 303; nº 5656; 343–348.
 1980, The 5′ ends of Drosophila heat shock genes in chromatin are hypersensitive to DNase I, in: Nature. Vol. 286, nº 5776; 854–860.
 2006 with J Wysocka, T Swigut, H Xiao, TA Milne, SY Kwon, J Landry, M Kauer, AJ Tackett, BT Chait, P Badenhorst, CD Allis, A PHD finger of NURF couples histone H3 lysine 4 trimethylation with chromatin remodelling, in: Nature. Vol. 42, nº 7098; 86–90.
 2000 with X Shen, G Mizuguchi, A Hamiche, A chromatin remodelling complex involved in transcription and DNA processing, in: Nature. Vol. 406, nº 6795; 541–544.
 1995 with T Tsukiyama, Purification and properties of an ATP-dependent nucleosome remodeling factor, in: Cell. Vol. 83, nº 6; 1011–1020.

References

Year of birth missing (living people)
Living people
American people of Chinese descent
American molecular biologists
Johns Hopkins University faculty
Members of the United States National Academy of Sciences
Members of the National Academy of Medicine
Members of Academia Sinica
Hong Kong scientists
Hong Kong emigrants to the United States
Saint Mary's College of California alumni
Chinese molecular biologists
Harvard University alumni